is a Japanese film, television, video game and non-soundtrack music composer, arranger and conductor. He is the son of the composer Katsuhisa Hattori and grandson of composer Ryoichi Hattori.  He has won three Japan Academy Prize awards in the category Outstanding Achievement in Music and was the music director of the Japan Pavilion at the Expo 2010. In recent years, Hattori has worked with popular supergroup JAM Project, serving as orchestral arranger and conductor on two of their albums, Victoria Cross and THUMB RISE AGAIN, as well as in their live concerts promoting said albums.

He graduated from the Conservatoire de Paris in 1988 and since then has worked in Japan. The works he has scored include all of the Slayers anime films and OAV series, Martian Successor Nadesico anime television series and film, live-action films Godzilla 2000, Godzilla vs. SpaceGodzilla and Welcome Back, Mr. McDonald, anime television series Battle Athletes, Code:Breaker, Ground Defense Force! Mao-chan and Sister Princess, anime films Space Brothers, Rough, Godzilla: Planet of the Monsters, Godzilla: City on the Edge of Battle, and Godzilla: The Planet Eater, TV drama series Great Teacher Onizuka, Hero, Nodame Cantabile, Current Doraemon films, Hanzawa Naoki, Downtown Rocket and Shinsengumi!, video games Arc the Lad: Twilight of the Spirits and Intelligent Qube, and TV show Hook Book Row.

External links

1965 births
20th-century conductors (music)
20th-century Japanese composers
20th-century Japanese male musicians
21st-century conductors (music)
21st-century Japanese composers
21st-century Japanese male musicians
Anime composers
Conservatoire de Paris alumni
Japanese conductors (music)
Japanese film score composers
Japanese male film score composers
Japanese male conductors (music)
Japanese music arrangers
Living people
Musicians from Tokyo